Otozoum ("giant animal") is an extinct ichnospecies of fossilized sauropodomorph dinosaur footprints and other markings in sandstones. They were made by heavy, bipedal animals (probably dinosaurs) with a short stride that walked on four toes directed forward.

Otozoum tracks were discovered by American paleontologist Edward Hitchcock, who described Otozoum as the "most extraordinary track yet brought to light in this valley [the Connecticut River] representing a bipedal animal... distinguished from all others... in the sandstone of New England". The ichnogenus was named by him in 1847, after the giant Otus.

In 1953, Yale University paleontologist Richard Swann Lull revised Hitchcock's work, suggesting that the track maker might have been a prosauropod. Other sources have been proposed, including a crocodile-like animal (e.g. the phytosaur Rutiodon), or an ornithopod dinosaur, although recent osteological comparisons (e.g., Rainforth, 2003) support Lull's hypothesis that the track maker was indeed a prosauropod.  

Hitchcock noted the excellent preservation of some tracks, preserving details of the skin, pads, and even impressions of Jurassic raindrops. Excellent Otozoum specimens from the Portland Quarry may be seen in the Dinosaur State Park and Arboretum in Rocky Hill, Connecticut.

See also
 List of dinosaur ichnogenera

References

 Biology Online
 Martin Lockley, The Eternal Trail: A Tracker Looks at Evolution, Basic Books, 2001. .

Dinosaur trace fossils